Last Embrace is a 1979 American neo-noir thriller film directed by Jonathan Demme. Very loosely based on the novel The 13th Man by Murray Teigh Bloom, it stars Roy Scheider and Janet Margolin, telling the story of a woman who takes the role similar to the biblical avenger Goel and kills the descendants of the Zwi Migdal, who enslaved her grandmother. Obvious Hitchcockian references abound -- a chase in a bell tower, a threatening pair of scissors, an interrupted shower, the cliffhanger finale -- suggesting that homage to Alfred Hitchcock is more important than fidelity to the source novel.

Plot

In a Mexican cantina across the border from El Paso, Texas, government agent Harry Hannan is romancing his wife, Dorothy, when he observes an informant he is supposed to meet in a few days. Realizing he is about to be attacked, he shoves his wife to the ground and starts shooting at the informant's companions who return fire and flee the restaurant. Dorothy is killed in the attack, and he suffers a nervous breakdown. Harry spends five months in a Connecticut sanitarium before being released.

On his way back to New York City, Harry stumbles and nearly falls into the path of an express train. He goes to the makeup counter at Macy's Herald Square to retrieve his next assignment, but the assignment slip inside the lipstick case is blank. He accosts his contact who assures him that the agency probably does not have any work for him.

When Harry returns to his apartment, he finds it is occupied by a doctoral student named Ellie Fabian. She explains that she had a sublet arranged while she was in the last semester of her studies at Princeton University. Ellie claims that the housing office said the Hannans would be gone indefinitely. She gives Harry a note that was slipped under the door, but it contains only a few Hebrew characters that he cannot read.

Paranoid that he is being targeted by his own agency, Harry visits his supervisor Eckart, who assures Harry that the agency has higher priorities. Eckart insists that Harry is not ready to return to the field, but that he is perfectly safe.

Harry takes the Hebrew note to a local rabbi who can only partially decode it, and explains that it means "Avenger of Blood.". The rabbi then calls Sam Urdell, and informs him that Harry has visited him.  Harry notices that he is being surveilled, loses the tail and goes to the American Museum of Natural History, where Ellie is working.

He gives her some money and urges her to stay in a hotel, because he fears she will be accidentally targeted. He then visits his wife's grave, where he confronts her brother, Dave Quittle. Afterwards, Quittle visits Eckhart, who orders Harry's murder.

Ellie stays in the apartment despite Harry's request. Ellie suggests that they take the note to her friend at Princeton who specializes in Hebrew studies. When Harry wakes from a nightmare, he tells Ellie about the death of Dorothy. He takes a prescription pill, but spits it out, realizing that it is cyanide. The next morning, they leave for Princeton. On the train, Ellie tells Harry about her grandmother, when Harry notices  Quittle, and an old man, watching them.

At Princeton, Richard Peabody decodes the note for Harry. Peabody has accumulated several notes, all attached to very peculiar murders. Harry is the first one to have received the note and lived. He also relays a message that someone wants to meet Harry in the bell tower courtyard the following day.

In the courtyard, Harry is lured into a trap by Quittle. Harry manages to kill Quittle during a shootout in the bell tower, and then encounters Sam Urdell, the old man on the train. Sam explains that he is part of a committee investigating the blood murders. They investigate the various clues, and they piece together that Harry's grandfather owned a brothel on the Lower East Side of Manhattan.

In a hotel at Niagara Falls, Ellie is dressed as a prostitute and lures Bernie Meckler into a bathtub with her. As she has sex with Meckler, she drowns him. As Harry and Sam put together their information, they are led back to Princeton. Harry realizes that Ellie is the one murdering men, on behalf of victims of white slavery like her grandmother. They drive up to Niagara Falls, where they have an emotional confrontation. She tries to kill him, but confesses that she loves him. He is conflicted, but he tells her that he will turn her in. Ellie runs from him, and he chases her through the Robert Moses Niagara Power Plant. She escapes onto a tour bus and he steals another tour bus and follows her to the Cave of the Winds, where he chases her through the tunnels until they have a final confrontation at the edge of the falls. They break through the railing and Harry grabs Ellie, but she struggles and takes a deadly plummet.

Cast
 Roy Scheider as Harry Hannan
 Janet Margolin as Ellie Fabian
 John Glover as Richard Peabody
 Sam Levene as Sam Urdell
 Charles Napier as Dave Quittle
 Christopher Walken as Eckart
 Jacqueline Brookes as Dr. Coopersmith
 Andrew Duncan as Bernie Meckler
 David Margulies as Rabbi Drexel
 Marcia Rodd as Adrian
 Gary Goetzman as Tour Guide
 Lou Gilbert as Rabbi Jacobs
 Mandy Patinkin as First Commuter
 Max Wright as Second Commuter
 Sandy McLeod as Dorothy Hannan
 Joe Spinell as Man In Cantina

Reception
The film received mixed reviews from critics. Vincent Canby in The New York Times wrote of Scheider: "No other leading actor can create so much tension out of such modest material." As of July 2022, Last Embrace holds a rating of 58% on Rotten Tomatoes, based on 24 reviews.

References

External links

1979 films
1970s mystery films
1970s psychological thriller films
American mystery films
American neo-noir films
Films based on American novels
United Artists films
Films directed by Jonathan Demme
Films shot in New York (state)
Films shot in New Jersey
Films set in Texas
Films scored by Miklós Rózsa
1970s English-language films
1970s American films